Irwin Vincent Davis was an athletic director and head football coach at Saint Francis University, from which he retired in 1979. He was inducted into the Saint Francis University Athletics Hall of Fame in 1996.

Early years
Born in Ponchatoula, Louisiana, Davis attended Ponchatoula High School where he participated in football, basketball, and track for four years. Davis matriculated to the University of Notre Dame where he was a three-year member of both the track team, and the football team as an offensive and defensive lineman.  Davis majored in physical education.

Head coaching record
Davis was head coach at Saint Francis for four seasons, compiling a record of 14–27–1.

References

 

Year of birth missing
Year of death missing
Saint Francis Red Flash football coaches
Saint Francis Red Flash athletic directors
Notre Dame Fighting Irish football players
Notre Dame Fighting Irish men's track and field athletes
People from Ponchatoula, Louisiana
Coaches of American football from Louisiana
Players of American football from Louisiana
Track and field athletes from Louisiana